Kunwar Tara Singh (4 December 1807 – 1859), sometimes styled as Shahzada was the younger of the twins of Maharaja Ranjit Singh, founder of Sikh Empire and his first wife Maharani Mehtab Kaur. His elder twin brother was Maharaja Sher Singh, who briefly became the ruler of the Sikh Empire from 1841 until his death in 1843. 

It is said that his actual mother was Manki, a Muslim servant in the household of Sada Kaur He died in 1859, after the Sikh war.

Note

Sikh Empire
1807 births
1859 deaths